Puncturella similis is a species of sea snail, a marine gastropod mollusk in the family Fissurellidae, the keyhole limpets.

Description
The length of the shell attains 5.9 mm.

Distribution
This species occurs at methane seeps in deep water off the Congo River.

References

 Warén A. & Bouchet P. (2009). New gastropods from deep-sea hydrocarbon seeps off West Africa. Deep Sea Research Part II: Topical Studies in Oceanography 56(23): 2326-2349

Fissurellidae
Gastropods described in 2009